The 2008 Grand National (officially known as the John Smith's Grand National for sponsorship reasons) was the 161st official annual running of the Grand National steeplechase which took place at Aintree Racecourse near Liverpool, England, on 5 April 2008 and attracted the maximum permitted field of 40 runners, competing for total prize money of £450,640.

Joint-favourite Comply or Die and Irish jockey Timmy Murphy won the race (it was Murphy's eleventh attempt at the National), four lengths ahead of King John's Castle in second place and Snowy Morning in third.

Competitors and betting
Cloudy Lane, ridden by Jason Maguire, was the long-time ante-post favourite but was joined just before the off by Comply or Die, ridden by Timmy Murphy; the pair sent off as 7–1 joint-favourites. The top weight of 11 stone and 12 lbs was carried by former winner Hedgehunter, ridden by Ruby Walsh. The full order of betting at the off was as follows:

Three riders were having their thirteenth ride in the race: Mick Fitzgerald, who won the race in 1996 on Rough Quest, Paul Carberry, who won the race in 1999 on Bobbyjo, and Tony McCoy. Other former winning riders competing were Ruby Walsh (Hedgehunter in 2005 and Papillon in 2000), Barry Geraghty (Monty's Pass in 2003), Tony Dobbin (Lord Gyllene in 1997) and Robbie Power (Silver Birch in 2007).

Ardaghey was listed as first reserve and was called into the race when Opera Mundi was withdrawn the day before.

The race
The runners were sent away to a clean first start with No Full leading over the first fence, which all 40 runners cleared safely. The fences leading up to the sixth, Becher's Brook, claimed seven runners as Black Apalachi fell having taken the lead at the second; L'Ami, whose rider Mick Fitzgerald had to go to hospital with neck and back injuries, and Backbeat also fell. Tumbling Dice and Iron Man both unseated their riders when taking off too soon at the third, while Ardaghey and Fundamentalist got in too close to the fourth fence and both fell, leaving 31 runners continuing to Becher's, led by Mr. Pointment and Milan Deux Mille.

No Full was up in the leading dozen runners when he clipped the top of Becher's and fell, and the casualties increased at the Canal Turn where Madison Du Berlais fell and hampered Philson Run, whose rider was unseated. The 11th fence claimed two more fallers when Contraband and Kelami both failed to negotiate that obstacle, leaving 26 to complete the first circuit.

The water jump (16th fence) marked the end of the first circuit and was taken with Chelsea Harbour having moved up to lead from Mr. Pointment, D'Argent, Simon and Comply Or Die next in a tightly-packed field, which was reduced by one when Point Barrow was pulled up. Five other runners all left the contest before reaching Becher's Brook for the second time; Voldka Bleu, Naunton Brook and Bob Hall were all pulled up before the 19th; Joacci fell at the next and McKelvey also unseated his rider. McKelvey then veered sharply off the course after falling when trying to negotiate the running rails and suffering fatal injuries.

At Becher's Brook for the second time the first dozen remained tightly grouped consisting of Chelsea Harbour, Mr. Pointment, Comply or Die, the grey D'Argent, Butler's Cabin, Snowy Morning, Idle Talk, Bewley's Berry, Knowhere, Simon, Mon Mome and Hedgehunter; Butler's Cabin fell there. 

Knowhere and Simon were beginning to lose touch when unseated at Valentine's fence, where Turko also fell. Joint-favourite Cloudy Lane had never been in the front rank and now looked too far off the pace to mount a challenge, as did Nadover, Bailey Breeze and Hi Cloy, with Cornish Sett and Milan Deux Mille tailed off with five fences to jump.

D'Argent also looked like he was just starting to drop away when he fell four fences from home. Comply or Die took the final fence the best and was never headed on the long run-in, winning by four lengths from King John's Castle and Snowy Morning; Slim Pickings was again fourth. Eleven others finished in the following order: Bewley's Berry, Cloudy Lane, Nadover, Baily Breeze, Chelsea Harbour, Mon Mome, Hi Cloy, Cornish Sett, Hedgehunter, Idle Talk and Milan Deux Mille. Dun Doire was pulled up before jumping the second-last fence and long-time leader Mr. Pointment pulled up before the last.

Aftermath
It was the first Grand National win for all of the connections with Comply or Die, with jockey Timmy Murphy telling reporters that the race was the highlight of his career, confessing that the trainer had said the horse was a certainty to win. Owner David Johnson was also delighted to win after having had around 20 horses compete unsuccessfully in previous Nationals.

All of the other jockeys to complete the course returned stating their happiness with their mounts and such was the competitive nature of the race that all had felt they still had a chance at Becher's on the second circuit, the only exception being Tom Malone, whose Milan Deux Mille was already tailed off at that stage and finished a long way behind the rest.

2008 was Tony Dobbin's final ride in the Grand National, having announced his retirement before the race.

As a result of spinal injuries suffered in the race, Mick Fitzgerald also announced his retirement from race riding later that year.

Media coverage

The National was televised live in the United Kingdom in a four-hour-long broadcast on BBC One, presented by Clare Balding with Rishi Persad and guest presenter Richard Dunwoody. The commentary team of four commentators was Ian Bartlett, Tony O'Hehir, Darren Owen and lead commentator Jim McGrath who called the winner home for the eleventh consecutive year. 

The action was broadcast via fifty-two cameras, including cameras situated inside fences, although the use of jockey cams, cameras placed inside riders helmets was not used this year. The famous head-on elevated shot of Becher's Brook, which became synonymous with the fence for almost 50 years was replaced with a low angle shot. This was the 49th annual broadcast of the race live by the BBC.

Jockeys
For the second consecutive year, Tony McCoy, Mick Fitzgerald and Paul Carberry weighed out as the most experienced riders in the race, each taking their thirteenth attempt at a Grand National. Both Fitzgerald (1996) and Carberry (1999) had previously won the race but McCoy joined Jeff King, Peter Scudamore and David Nicholson in having faced the starter thirteen times in the National without ever being winner or runner-up, although in Scudamore's case this included the void race of 1993. It proved to be the final race that Fitzgerald rode in as he suffered serious neck, back and knee ligament injuries from his fall from L'Ami at the second fence. It forced him to retire from race riding.

Eight riders made their debut in the race with Paddy Flood, Aidan Coleman and Nick Scholfield all completing the course while Wilson Renwick fell at the second fence.

References
Notes

Sources
Official BBC coverage of the 2008 Grand National

Grand National
 2008
Grand National
21st century in Merseyside
Grand
April 2008 sports events in the United Kingdom